The National Database & Registration Authority (NADRA) is an independent and autonomous agency under the control of the Interior Secretary of Pakistan that regulates government databases and statistically manages the sensitive registration database of all the national citizens of Pakistan. Currently, Tariq Malik is serving as Chairman of National Database and Registration Authority (NADRA) Pakistan.

Nadra is also responsible to issuing the computerised national identity cards to the citizens of Pakistan, maintaining their sensitive informational upgraded in the government databases, and securing national identities of the citizens of Pakistan from being stolen and theft. It is one of the largest government database institution, employing more than 11,000 people in more than 800 domestic offices and five international offices.

Codified by the Second Amendment, §30 of the Constitution of Pakistan in 2000, the Constitution grants powers to NADRA to enact civil registration and sensitive databases of Pakistan's citizens; all databases are kept to ensure the safety of citizens' databases. The organisation is currently headed by Tariq Malik who is the current Chairman.

History 
After the independence of Pakistan, Prime Minister Liaquat Ali Khan launched the Personal Identity System (PIS) program to register, manage and issue national identification cards to all the citizens of Pakistan and Muslim refugees settling in Pakistan. Changes were carried out by Election Commission of Pakistan in 1965 for the process of the voter's registration to hold the nationwide 1965 presidential election. In 1969–70, the amendments in the PIS program continued by the Election Commission until the election commission supervised the 1970 general elections.

After the 1971 war resulted in East Pakistan gaining independence as Bangladesh, a new statistical database system was needed to ensure the safety of Pakistan's citizens as well as the national security of the country as questions were being raised over who was a Pakistani and who was not. So the Bhutto regime introduced a national registration act in the Parliament of Pakistan to establish an authority to issue photo IDs to all registered Pakistani citizens. In 1973, a new database system was codified under the Second Amendment, §30, of the Constitution of Pakistan to perform and contain the statistical database of the citizens of Pakistan. Registration of Pakistan's citizens and statistic database in government's computer accounts was started in 1973, with the promulgation of the Constitution of the country. This new program was visioned and started by then Prime Minister Zulfikar Ali Bhutto.

In 1973, in a parliamentary session, Bhutto stated in parliament to the people of Pakistan, "due to the absence of full statistical database of the people of this country, this country is operating in utter darkness". The government started issuing the National Identity Card (NIC) numbers to its citizens and started to establish government databases of the people in government computers.

National Database and Registration Authority (NADRA) was established on 10 March 2000, by merging Directorate General of Registration Pakistan, a department created under the 1973 Constitution, with the National Database Organisation (NDO), an attached department under the Ministry of Interior, Government of Pakistan created for the 1998 census. NADRA is an autonomous body to operate independently with the mandate to replace the old directorate general of Registration with a computerised system of registering 150 million citizens, NADRA launched the Multi-Biometric National Identity Card project developed in conformance with international security documentation issuance practices in the year 2000. The program replaced the paper based Personal Identity System of Pakistan that had been in use since 1973. To date, over 96 million citizens in Pakistan and abroad have utilised the system and its allied services to receive tamper-resistant ISO standard Identification Documents. The organization flourished in the time period of former Chairman Mr. Ali Arshad Hakeem.

Computerised National Identity Card 

The Computerised National Identity Card (CNIC) is a computerised national identity card issued by NADRA to Pakistani citizens. The CNIC was introduced in 2000 and, by 2012, over 89.5 million CNICs had been issued.

The CNIC is issued first at the age of 18. Under Pakistani law, it is not compulsory to carry one. However, for Pakistani citizens, the CNIC is mandatory for
 Voting
 Opening and operating bank accounts
 Obtaining a passport
 Obtaining a domicile certificate
 Obtaining an alcohol permit for non-Muslims
 Purchasing vehicles and land
 Obtaining a driver licence
 Purchasing a plane, train, or inter-city bus ticket
 Obtaining a mobile phone SIM card
 Obtaining an electricity, landline telephone, natural gas, or water and sewerage connection
 Securing admission to college and other post-graduate institutes
 Conducting major financial transactions
 Setting up a business
 Registering a marriage or divorce
 Opening a PO Box
 Sending a packet or parcel via courier services
 Buying or selling foreign currency via a bureau de change
Thus, it can be seen as a de facto necessity for meaningful civic life in Pakistan.

Requirements 
In Pakistan, all adult citizens must register for the Computerised National Identity Card (CNIC) with a unique number upon reaching the age of 18. It serves as an identification document to authenticate an individual's identity as the citizen of Pakistan. Before introduction of the CNIC, manual National Identity Cards                                                                                                                                                                                                                                                                     (NICs) were issued to citizens of Pakistan. Today, the Government has shifted all its existing records of National Identity Cards (NIC) to the central computerised database managed by NADRA. New CNIC's are machine-readable and carry facial and fingerprint information.

Every citizen is required to have a NIC number, and the number is required for many activities such as getting a driver licence or passport, registering a vehicle, receiving social insurance/Zakat funding, enrolling in school, college or technical institute, filing a legal affidavit, wiring funds, paying taxes, opening/operating a bank account, getting a utility connection (electricity, phone, mobile phone, water and sewer, natural gas), obtaining an alcohol permit for non-Muslim citizens, registering a marriage or divorce etc. However, since some Pakistanis do not conduct any of the activities described above, a few do not have ID cards. In 2007, NADRA announced that it had issued 60 million CNIC (the C standing for computerised) numbers, which is approximately one-third of the population. The authority had issued the 10 millionth CNIC on 11 February 2002; 20 millionth on 18 June 2002; 30 millionth on 22 December 2003; 40 millionth on 1 October 2004; and 50 millionth CNIC on 14 February 2006.

Features 
A unique 13-digit number is assigned at birth when the parents complete the child's birth registration form (Form RG-2, commonly known as B-Form or Child Registration Certificate (CRC)), and then a National Identity Card (NIC) with the same number is issued at the age of 18. Until 2001, NIC numbers were 11 digits long. In 2001-2002, the authority started issuing 13-digit NIC numbers along with their new Biometric ID cards. The first 5 digits are based on the applicant's locality, the next 7 are random numbers, and the last digit is a check digit, an even number for females and odd number for males. The old manual NIC numbers are invalid as of 1 January 2004.

The ID card has the following information on it: Legal Name, Gender (male, female, or transgender), Father's name (Husband's name for married females), Identification Mark, Date of Birth, National Identity Card Number, Family Tree ID Number, Current Address, Permanent Address, Date of Issue, Date of Expiry, Signature, Photo, and Fingerprint (Thumbprint) NADRA also records the applicant's religion, but this is not noted on the CNIC itself.
NADRA has registered over 90% of women in Pakistan, and NADRA has started issuing ultra modern SCNIC (Smart Computerised National Identity Card) too having information both in English and Urdu languages.

Secret behind every digit of the CNIC number
This 13-digit number, comprising three parts, is entirely different for every Pakistani.

The computerised national identity card (CNIC) issued by the National Database and Registration Authority (Nadra) verifies a person's Pakistani citizenship, however, there is a secret behind every digit of its 13-digit number.

This 13-digit number is entirely different for every Pakistani.

This number comprises three parts. The first part, which comprises five digits i.e. '12101', has its first digit identifying your province, second digit identifying your division, third & fourth digit identifying your district and fifth digit identifying your tehsil.

People whose CNIC number starts with 1, are residents of Khyber Pakhtunkhwa province, similarly, 2 represents FATA, 3 for Punjab, 4 for Sindh, 5 represents Balochistan, 6 for Islamabad and 7 represents Gilgit-Baltistan province.

The second digit in the CNIC number shows your division, which means every a digit identifies a different division in a province, while the rest of the three digit represent your district, tehsil and union council.

The second and middle part of the CNIC number, which comprises seven digits separated by hyphens i.e. XXXXX-1234567-X, is basically a code for the family number of a citizen. This code forms the family tree of a citizen.

The third part, which has only one digit following a hyphen, represents sex of a person. For a man, odd digits i.e. 1, 3, 5, 7, 9 are used, while even digits i.e. 2, 4, 6, 8 are used for women.

This is how a CNIC number is generated by the Nadra's automated system.

Smart Card
NADRA introduced the Smart National Identity Card (SNIC), Pakistan's first national electronic identity card, in October 2012. Pakistan's SNIC contains a data chip and 36 security features. The SNIC complies with ICAO standard 9303 and ISO standard 7816-4. The SNIC can be used for both offline and online identification, voting, pension disbursement, social and financial inclusion programmes and other services. NADRA aims to replace all 89.5 million CNICs with SNICs by 2020.

Tracking Smart National Identity Card 
In order to track a NADRA Smart Card, the tracking ID consisting of 12 digits is sent to 8400. For example, the tracking ID is 108231064935, and the message is sent to 8400, you will get the message "Your request against tracking id 108231064935 is with printing facility and expected delivery 2 working days".

Application for National Identity Card 
One can obtain his/her National Identity Card by either visiting the nearby NADRA office or by applying online. This online feature is really helpful. Especially, those Pakistanis who are expats can take advantage of this facility, being offered by NADRA.Online Application

Succession Certificate and Letter of Administration 
As of June 22, 2021, NADRA has started issuance of succession certificate / letter of administration in Karachi, Sindh.

Pak Identity 
NADRA has started its service of online application for the NICOP, POC and CRC. Online data is collected e.g. fingerprints, thumb impressions and signatures. Online fee is submitted through debit or credit card.

Achievements
 Top 50 e-Passport Technology Suppliers for 9 consecutive years in ID World Magazine, for 2005, 2006, 2007, 2008, 2009, 2010, 2011, 2012 and 2013.
 "Outstanding Achievement Award" at CARDEX Middle East in Cairo, Egypt in May, 2007.
 The Merit Exporter Award by Federation of Pakistan Chambers of Commerce & Industry (FPCCI) in 2006.
 NADRA's Chief Technology Officer, Mr. Usman Y. Mobin was awarded the "ID Talent Award" in November 2007 at the ID World International Congress held in Milan, Italy. He was recently awarded Tamghah-e-Imtiaz in 2009 for his services rendered to the State.
 Successfully achieved Capability Maturity Model Integration (CMMI) from Software Engineering Institute (SEI) Carnegie Mellon, USA.
 NADRA Quality Management and CNIC Production departments are also ISO 9001:2000 Certified.
 Deputy Chairman NADRA, Tariq Malik was awarded ID Outstanding Achievement Award on 3 November 2009, in Milan at an exclusive ceremony during the eighth ID WORLD International Congress, the Global Summit on Automatic Identification.
NADRA also tracks cases of fake identities through its system. When spotted and identified as fake identities, NADRA takes action by blocking those national identity cards.
By 2012, NADRA had cleaned up Pakistan's Voters List by removing approximately 37 Million "fake" voters from this list and adding more than 36 million new adults to the list

See also

 Federal Board of Revenue
 Pakistan Bureau of Statistics

References

External links
 National Database and Registration Authority
NADRA Jobs 2023

NADRA Jobs 2023

تمام پاکستانی اخبارات اور اخبارات کی نوکریوں سے نادرا جابز 2023 کے لیے 2024 آنے والی نوکریاں تلاش کریں۔ ہمارے پاس کراچی، لاہور، راولپنڈی، اسلام آباد، فیصل آباد، ملتان، حیدرآباد، کوئٹہ، پشاور، گجرات، ساہیوال، گوجرانوالہ، پنجاب، کے پی کے، سندھ، بلوچستان سمیت تمام شہروں سے مارچ 2023 نادرا کی نئی نوکریاں، فروری 2023 اور جنوری 2023 کی نوکریاں ہیں۔ اے جے کے وغیرہ نادرا کی نوکریاں تازہ ترین، تربیت یافتہ اور تجربہ کار کارکنوں کے لیے ہیں۔ ملازمتوں کی مکمل تفصیل، تنخواہ کی تفصیلات، تعلیم، تربیت، کورسز اور ہنر کی ضروریات، نادرا کی آج کی سرکاری اور نجی ملازمتوں کے لیے تجربے کی تفصیلات دیکھیں، جو میٹرک، انٹر، گریجویٹ، ماسٹر لیول اور اس سے اوپر کے لیے ہیں۔

Regulatory authorities of Pakistan

Civil registries
Databases in Pakistan
Government databases
2000 establishments in Pakistan
Government agencies established in 2000
Ministry of Interior (Pakistan)
Civil Registration and Vital Statistic